Olympic is a Czech rock band, founded in 1962 in Prague. The group celebrated 55 years in 2017.

Members
Petr Janda (guitar, lead vocals)
Milan Broum (bass guitar, backing vocals)
Martin Vajgl (drums, backing vocals)
Pavel Březina (keyboards, backing vocals)

Former members
Petr Kaplan (rhythm guitar, vocals, 1962–1963; died 2007)
Jaromír Klempíř (keyboards/ionika, 1962–1964; died 2016)
Pavel Bobek (vocals, 1962–1965; died 2013)
Jiří Laurent (rhythm guitar, vocals, 1963–1965; died 2016)
Miki Volek (vocals, 1962–1966; died 1996)
Pavel Chrastina (bass guitar, vocals, 1962–1969; died 2021)
Jan Antonín Pacák (drums, vocals, 1965–1971; died 2007)
Petr Hejduk (drums, vocals, 1971–1985; died 1995)
Miroslav Berka (keyboards, vocals, 1962–1987; died 1987)
Milan Peroutka (drums, vocals, 1986–2013; died 2013)
Jiří Valenta (keyboards, vocals, 1986–2020)

Discography

Studio albums
1968: Želva (Supraphon)
1969: Pták Rosomák (Supraphon)
1971: Jedeme jedeme (Supraphon)
1973: Olympic 4 (Supraphon)
1978: Marathon (Supraphon)
1980: Prázdniny na Zemi (Supraphon)
1981: Ulice (Supraphon)
1984: Laboratoř (Supraphon) / Laboratory (Artia)
1985: Kanagom (Supraphon)
1986: Bigbít (Supraphon)
1988: Když ti svítí zelená (Supraphon)
1990: Ó jé (Supraphon)
1994: Dávno BEST I.A., a.s.
1997: Brejle BEST I.A., a.s.
1999: Karavana BEST I.A., a.s.
2003: Dám si tě klonovat BEST I.A., a.s.
2006: Trilogy (3CD) BEST I.A., a.s. Pozn.: Znovunatočená alba Prázdniny..., Ulice a Laboratoř
2007: Sopka BEST I.A., a.s.
2011: Back to Love BEST I.A., a.s. Pozn.: Nikdy nevydané album natočené ve Francii 1969.
2013: Souhvězdí šílenců (Supraphon)
2014: Souhvězdí drsňáků (Supraphon)
2015: Souhvězdí romantiků (Supraphon)
2018: Trilobit (Supraphon)
2020: Kaťata (Supraphon)

References

External links 

 

Czechoslovak rock music groups
Czech rock music groups
Musical groups established in 1962
Zlatý slavík winners
1962 establishments in Czechoslovakia